Shade River State Forest is a state forest in Meigs County, Ohio. Forked Run State Park was carved out of it in 1949. Currently, this state forest comprises .

References

Ohio state forests
State forests of the Appalachians
Protected areas of Athens County, Ohio
Protected areas of Meigs County, Ohio